Alan-Michael is a given name. It may refer to:

Alan-Michael Cash (born 1987), American football player
Alan-Michael Spaulding, fictional character

See also
Alan Michael (born 1967), Scottish artist
Alan Michael Sugar (born 1947), English businessman

Compound given names